There are around 60 villages in Rahata tehsil of Ahmednagar district of state of Maharashtra. Following is the list of village in Rahata tehsil.

A
 Adgaon Bk
 Adgaon Kh
 Astagaon

B
 Babhaleshwar
 Bhagwatipur

C
 Chandrapur
 Chitali

D
 Dadh BK
 Dhangarwadi
 Dorhale
 Durgapur
 Dahegaon[ko]

E
 Ekrukhe

G
 Gogalgaon

H
 Hanmantgoan
 Hasnapur

J
 Jalgaon

K
 Khadkewake
 Kankuri
 Kelwad
 Korhale
 Kolhar Bk

L
 Lohagaon
 Loni Bk
 Loni Khurd

M
 Mamdapur

N
 Nandur Bk
 Nandurkhi Bk
 Nandurkhi Kh
 Nighoj
 Nimgoan Korhale
 Nathu Patlachi Wadi

P
 Pathare Budruk
 Pimplas
 Pimpri Lokai
 Pimpri Nirmal
 Pimpalwadi
 Puntamba

R
 Rajuri
 Rampurwadi
 Ranjangaon Khurd
 Ranjankhol 
 Rui

S
 Sakuri
 Savalvihir Bk.
 Savalvihir Kh.
 Shingave
 Shirdi

T
 Tisgoan

W
 Wakadi
 Walki

See also
 Rahata tehsil
 Tehsils in Ahmednagar
 Villages in Akole tehsil
 Villages in Jamkhed tehsil
 Villages in Karjat tehsil
 Villages in Kopargaon tehsil
 Villages in Nagar tehsil
 Villages in Nevasa tehsil
 Villages in Parner tehsil
 Villages in Pathardi tehsil
 Villages in Rahuri tehsil
 Villages in Sangamner tehsil
 Villages in Shevgaon tehsil
 Villages in Shrigonda tehsil
 Villages in Shrirampur tehsil

References

 
Rahata